The 2015 Volta a Portugal was a men's road bicycle race held from 29 July to 9 August 2015. It is the 77th edition of the men's stage race to be held, which was established in 1927. As part of the 2015 UCI Europe Tour, it is rated as a 2.1 event.
Just before the start, the race was marked by controversy due to UCI an regulation amendment restricting the teams to 8 riders (with exception of the 3 big races-Giro, Tour and Vuelta), issue just one month before the Volta.
The race director, Joaquim Gomes achieved an exception and the teams raced with 9 riders each.
Gustavo Veloso repeated the 2014 success.

Participating teams
In total, 16 teams are set to compete.

National teams:

International teams:

Schedule

Classification leadership

Classification standings

Prologue
29 July 2015 — Viseu, 6 km individual time trial (ITT)

Prologue result and general classification

Stage 1
30 July 2015 — Pinhel to Bragança, 196.8 km

Stage 2
31 July 2015 — Macedo de Cavaleiros to Montalegre - Serra do Larouco, 175.6 km

Stage 3
1 August 2015 — Boticas to Fafe, 172.2 km

Stage 4
2 August 2015 — Alvarenga (Arouca) to Mondim de Basto (Srª da Graça), 159.4 km

Stage 5
3 August 2015 — Braga to Viana do Castelo, 169.4 km

Stage 6
4 August 2015 — Ovar to Oliveira de Azeméis, 154.1 km

Stage 7
6 August 2015 — Condeixa-a-Nova to Torre, 171.31 km

Stage 8
7 August 2015 — Guarda to Castelo Branco, 180.2 km

Stage 9
8 August 2015 — ITT Pedrógão Beach to Leiria, 34.2 km

Stage 10
9 August 2015 — Vila Franca de Xira to Lisbon, 132.5 km

Final standings

References

External links

2015
Volta a Portugal
Volta a Portugal